Hopkins is a small suburban city in Hennepin County, Minnesota, United States, located west of Minneapolis. Hopkins was the headquarters of Minneapolis-Moline, which was a large manufacturer of tractors and agricultural equipment in the United States until the 1960s. The southern end of town sits along the main line of the Twin Cities and Western Railroad. 

The city is four square miles in size and is surrounded by the larger suburban communities of Minnetonka, Saint Louis Park, and Edina. The population was 19,079 at the 2020 census. U.S. Highway 169 and Minnesota State Highway 7 are two of the main routes in the area. The city's main street was added to the National Register of Historic Places in 2022.

Geography
There are several small ponds on the western side of Hopkins, and creeks to the north and south. One of these creeks includes Minnehaha Creek. The north branch of Nine Mile Creek has its headwaters in Hopkins at the intersection of 13th Avenue South and Excelsior Boulevard.

Demographics

2020 census 
As of the census of 2020, there were 19,079 people, and 9,220 households, residing in the city. The population density was 4,696.9 inhabitants per square mile (1,813.5/km2). The racial makeup of the city was 64.2% White, 21.5% African American, 0.1% Native American, 7.1% Asian, 5.4% from two or more races, and 8.8% Hispanic or Latino.

The average household size was 2.02 and 22% of persons age 5 years+, 2017-2021 spoke a language other than English spoken at home. 

94.2 % of people age 25 years+, 2017-2021 had a high school graduate or higher. 47.5%  of persons age 25 years+, 2017-2021 had a Bachelor's degree or higher. 72.5% population age 16 years+, 2017-2021 were in civilian labor force, compared to 66.1% of all females age 16 years+. 

9.5% of people under age 65 years, 2017-2020 had a disability, and 6.9%of persons under age 65 years, did not have health insurance. 

The median household income (in 2021 dollars), 2017-2021 was $60,824.The per capita income in past 12 months (in 2021 dollars), 2017-2021 was $40,770.11.8% of People lived in poverty.

2010 census
As of the census of 2010, there were 17,591 people, 8,366 households, and 3,975 families residing in the city. The racial makeup of the city was 70.4% White, 13.5% African American, 0.6% Native American, 8.5% Asian, 3.4% from other races, and 3.6% from two or more races. Hispanic or Latino of any race were 7.9% of the population.

There were 8,366 households, of which 24.9% had children under the age of 18 living with them, 31.4% were married couples living together, 12.1% had a female householder with no husband present, 4.0% had a male householder with no wife present, and 52.5% were non-families. 43.4% of all households were made up of individuals, and 11.5% had someone living alone who was 65 years of age or older. The average household size was 2.07 and the average family size was 2.93.

The median age in the city was 34.4 years. 21.1% of residents were under the age of 18; 8.4% were between the ages of 18 and 24; 34.3% were from 25 to 44; 23.4% were from 45 to 64; and 12.6% were 65 years of age or older. The gender makeup of the city was 47.6% male and 52.4% female.

2000 census
At the 2000 census, there were 17,145 people, 8,224 households and 3,741 families residing in the city. There were 8,390 housing units at an average density of 2,058.2 pe square mile (794.0/km). The racial makeup of the city was 82.61% White, 5.19% African American, 0.78% Native American, 5.92% Asian, 0.09% Pacific Islander, 2.58% from other races, and 2.82% from two or more races. Hispanic or Latino of any race were 5.54% of the population. 23.9% were of German, 12.4% Norwegian, 7.4% Irish and 7.1% Swedish ancestry.

There were 8,224 households, of which 22.7% had children under the age of 18 living with them, 31.4% were married couples living together, 10.5% had a female householder with no husband present, and 54.5% were non-families. 42.9% of all households were made up of individuals, and 12.1% had someone living alone who was 65 years of age or older. The average household size was 2.03 and the average family size was 2.85.

19.6% of the population were under the age of 18, 10.7% from 18 to 24, 37.2% from 25 to 44, 18.0% from 45 to 64, and 14.5% who were 65 years of age or older. The median age was 34 years. For every 100 females, there were 90.6 males. For every 100 females age 18 and over, there were 87.5 males.

The median household income was $39,203 and the median family income was $50,359. Males had a median income of $37,541 versus $30,687 for females. The per capita income for the city was $26,759. About 8.1% of families and 9.3% of the population were below the poverty line, including 12.3% of those under age 18 and 6.7% of those age 65 or over.

Housing
Hopkins has a much lower homeownership rate than neighboring communities. The city's 39 percent homeownership rate is 22 percentage points less than the 61 percent of St. Louis Park, which has the next lowest rate among Hopkins’ neighbors. Other west metro communities fall in the mid-70 percent range.

Housing also tends to be more affordable than most west metro communities. Hopkins’ $225,200 median value is the lowest among its neighbors. The median housing value for St. Louis Park, which is next lowest, is 6.75 percent higher at $240,400.

Government

City charter
Hopkins’ government structure is set by its city charter. Hennepin County district court judges appointed the first Hopkins Charter Commission on February 8, 1946, in order to create a proposed charter that would be voted on. The commission submitted the proposed charter to the Village Council on November 4, 1947. Voters approved the charter December 2, 1947. The charter has been amended numerous times since then, most recently in October 2012.

Government structure
The charter specifies that Hopkins use a council-manager plan. The council controls city administration but does so exclusively through the city manager. The charter contains an “interference with administration” clause that expressly forbids the council from telling the city manager whom to hire or preventing the city manager from using his or her judgment to make administrative appointments. It also prohibits the council from issuing orders to any of the city manager's subordinates.

Mayor and council
The council is made up of the mayor and four council members elected at-large. The mayor serves a two-year term in office. Council members have four-year terms—with two of the seats on the ballot in one election and the other two seats up in the following election. Regular elections take place in odd years.

The mayor votes on all motions before the council like the council members. The position is also the head of the city for ceremonial purposes, serving legal processes and martial law.

The mayor is paid $6,000 per year and council members are paid $4,600 per year. The current salaries were set in 1998.

Presidents and mayors

City manager
The city manager is the chief administrator of the City of Hopkins. The Hopkins City Council appoints the city manager for an indefinite period and may remove the manager at any time.

Subordinate employees
The charter specifies just two other administrative positions by name. It requires the city to have a clerk, who is subordinate to the city manager, and allows for, but doesn't require, a city attorney to advise the council on legal matters.

However, the charter specifies that the city manager can create city departments and divisions and alter them when necessary. Hopkins has seven departments, each with a department head that reports to the city manager.  The departments are:
 Administration
 Community Services (Assessing, City Clerk, Inspections)
 Finance
 Fire
 Planning & Economic Development
 Police
 Public Works 
 Recreation (operated jointly with Minnetonka, Minnesota)

History

The first non-indigenous settlers of Hopkins arrived in 1852 as land around the growing Minneapolis–Saint Paul area was opening up and being explored by members stationed at Fort Snelling.  However, the roots of the town begin in 1887 with the building of the Minneapolis Threshing Machine Company, later called Minneapolis-Moline, to make farm equipment.  At the time, Minneapolis Moline employed most of the Hopkins residents.  In 1887, the West Minneapolis Land Company was founded and formed to build housing for the Minneapolis Moline factory workers. 

In 1893, residents of Hopkins sent the Hennepin County Board of Commissioners a petition signed by 41 residents, asking that a separate village be formed from unincorporated portions of then-Minnetonka and Richfield Townships.  Following an election, the community was then incorporated as the Village of West Minneapolis with a population of 1,105.  The original village consisted of about three square miles, and it has been enlarged by annexation to its present size of about four square miles.

In 1928, the name of the village was changed to Hopkins after Harley H. Hopkins, who was among its first homesteaders and was the community's first postmaster.  Mr. Hopkins allowed the town to build the train depot on his land (now The Depot Coffee House) with the agreement that the train station would say "Hopkins" on it.  People getting off the train assumed the name of the town was Hopkins and it stuck.  On January 1, 1948, the village became the city of Hopkins, upon adoption of a council–city manager charter.

Timeline
 1852 – First non-indigenous settlers arrived
 1862 – First school, Burnes, built
 1887 – Minneapolis Threshing Machine Company built
 1893 – November 7, 1168 people incorporated the village of West Minneapolis
 1893 – December 9, first city-council elected
 1899 – Streetcar arrived in Hopkins
 1928 – July 7, village name changed to Hopkins
 1929 – Minneapolis Threshing Machine Company becomes Minneapolis-Moline
 1934 – Hopkins business people organized the first Hopkins Raspberry Festival
 1947 – December 2, Hopkins became a city through the adoption of a city charter
 2022 - Hopkins Mainstreet designated on the list of the National Register of Historic Places

Hopkins Raspberry Festival
The Hopkins Raspberry Festival is an annual event in Hopkins.  The Hopkins Raspberry Festival was founded in 1935 as a way to boost business during the Great Depression of the 1930s.  A date of July 21 was chosen to hold the event to coincide with the peak of raspberry-picking season. The festival now takes place the third weekend in July every year.

The Raspberry Festival is overseen by a board of directors supported by many additional volunteers and local civic organizations each year. Since its inception, it has evolved into a dynamic community celebration with activities including music, sporting events, royalty coronations, craft fair, and parade.

National Register of History Places

The main street of Hopkins, from 8th to 11th avenues, was officially listed on the National Register of Historic Places in January, 2022. The designation was revealed during a ceremony in April of 2022.

Education

Public schools
The Hopkins School District serves all or parts of seven Minneapolis west suburban communities:  Hopkins, Minnetonka, Golden Valley, Plymouth, Edina, Eden Prairie, and Saint Louis Park.  Approximately 8,100 students attend seven elementary schools (K–sixth grade), two junior high schools (7th–9th grade), and one high school (10th–12th grade).  Some students attend public schools in other school districts chosen by their families under Minnesota's open enrollment statute, as some students from outside Hopkins school district enroll in Hopkins schools on that basis.

located in Minnetonka
located in Golden Valley

Private schools

There are two private schools in Hopkins:
 The Blake School:  A large private school with several campuses throughout the Twin Cities was founded in Hopkins, and the Blake Campus in the city houses both the Middle School and one of its two Lower Schools.
 Agamim Classical Academy (relocated)
Chesterton Academy

Charter schools
 Mainstreet School of Performing Arts (MSSPA): A performing arts school that focuses on the three major performing arts areas; music, dance and theater.  The school opened in 2004 and eventually moved to Eden Prairie, MN being renamed to Performing Institute of Minnesota Arts High School (PiM Arts High School).  Grades 9–12.
 Ubah Medical Academy is a charter high school currently leasing space in the Katherine Curren Elementary building.  The school was chartered in 2003 and was previously housed in Minneapolis.

Notable people
Nate Berkus (born 1971) - interior designer, author and television personality
Travis Boyd - professional ice hockey player
Aaron Brown – broadcast journalist on ABC and CNN.[18] Most recognized for his coverage of the September 11, 2001 attacks.
Paige Bueckers - American college basketball player for the University of Connecticut
Walter Bush – As a national leader in the growth and development of amateur and professional hockey elected to the U. S. Hockey Hall of Fame in 2000.
David Carr – Media and culture columnist for The New York Times.[20] Author of a memoir and best seller ‘’The Night of the Gun.’’ Early in his journalist career he was the editor of the ‘’Twin Cities Reader,’’ a weekly alternative newspaper in Minneapolis.
Amir Coffey - an professional basketball player for the Los Angeles Clippers 
Daniel Grodnik (movie producer) - Writer/producer of more than 65 films including, 'National Lampoon's Christmas Vacation', former Chairman/CEO of The National Lampoon and an adjunct professor in producing at the University of Southern California and Chapman University. Went to Alice Smith grade school and Hopkins High. Lettered in Ski jumping.
John Hardgrove – Wisconsin State Assemblyman.
Samantha Harris – Television hostess and actress. Her most prominent role was as E! Entertainment correspondent and a Dancing with the Stars co-host.
John B. Keefe - Minnesota state legislator, lawyer, and judge.
Jerry Knickerbocker - Minnesota state legislator and businessman.
Peyton Manning - Veteran quarterback and two-time Super Bowl winner who attended Tanglen Elementary School in Hopkins during the time his father, Archie Manning, quarterbacked for the Minnesota Vikings.  
Adele Parkhurst - Soprano concert singer in the 1920s.
BeBe Shopp – Miss America, 1948.

References

External links

 Official City Website
 Hopkins Historical Society
 

1852 establishments in Minnesota Territory
Cities in Hennepin County, Minnesota
Cities in Minnesota
Populated places established in 1852